Isaac Haqq (born Isaac Richard in July 1957) is an American businessman, educator, former municipal politician and father of two. He currently resides in Oakland, California, U.S.A. with his wife Sharon.

Personal life
Born Isaac Richard in July 1957, he was raised in Pasadena, California by a single mother as the eldest of 8 siblings. He would later change his last name to Haqq after a religious conversion to Islam.

Schooling
Haqq graduated from Pitzer College, a small liberal arts college in Claremont, California just east of Los Angeles. He later earned a master's degree in business from Columbia University.

Career
He was a member of the city council of Pasadena, California in the early 1990s while working as an investment banker for an Orange County firm. While on the city council Haqq gained a reputation for violence:, he broke someone's nose, swiped campaign signs, threatened the housing chief, berated a women's shelter worker and did three years probation for, among other things, throwing his sunglasses at a city bus. 

In 2001, Haqq opened University Preparatory Charter Academy in Oakland, which helped hundreds of inner-city kids graduate from high school and go to college. He resigned in July 2007, following allegations that the school's attendance records were falsified, that grades were falsified to allow failing students to graduate, and other scandals. The school faced closure after these allegations.

As of 2014, Isaac Richard was the director of an entity called the San Francisco College Center.

References

1957 births
American educators
Columbia Business School alumni
California city council members
Living people
Pitzer College alumni